was a Japanese politician of the Liberal Democratic Party, a member of the House of Representatives in the Diet (national legislature). A native of Shimizu, Shizuoka, and a graduate of the University of Tokyo, he was elected for the first time in 2000 after an unsuccessful run in 1996. He died of cancer in 2016.

References

External links 
  in Japanese.

1939 births
2016 deaths
People from Shizuoka (city)
University of Tokyo alumni
20th-century Japanese lawyers
Members of the House of Representatives (Japan)
Liberal Democratic Party (Japan) politicians
21st-century Japanese politicians